Xanthonia dentata is a species of leaf beetle. Its range spans Arizona, Colorado, New Mexico and Texas, and possibly Kansas. It is associated with oaks.

References

Further reading

 

Eumolpinae
Articles created by Qbugbot
Beetles described in 2002
Beetles of the United States